107th Rocket Brigade may refer to:
107th Rocket Brigade (Soviet Union), now the 107th Rocket Artillery Regiment of Ukraine
107th Rocket Brigade (Russia)